Route 95 is a city route located in Winnipeg, Manitoba. It runs in the southwest part of the city from Route 105 east to Route 42, near the Confusion Corner intersection. It is named Roblin Boulevard west of Assiniboine Park, where it then becomes Corydon Avenue for the remainder of its route.

Corydon and Roblin 
The Corydon Avenue segment of the route is home to Winnipeg's Little Italy District, and is currently served by the 18 North Main-Corydon Winnipeg Transit bus route. The avenue was named after Corydon Partlow Brown, a member of the Legislative Assembly of Manitoba from 1878 to 1888.

The more westerly Roblin Boulevard segment serves as the main street for the area of Charleswood. It was named for former Manitoba premier Rodmond Roblin, grandfather of Duff Roblin.

Major intersections
From west to east, all intersections are at-grade unless otherwise indicated:

References

095

Charleswood, Winnipeg
Tuxedo, Winnipeg
Fort Rouge, Winnipeg